Shangdu, also known as Xanadu, the summer capital of the Yuan Dynasty founded by Kublai Khan

Shangdu may also refer to:
Shangdu, Xilin Gol (上都), a town (镇) in the Plain Blue Banner of Xilin Gol league, Inner Mongolia, China
Shangdu County (商都), a county of Ulanqab, Inner Mongolia, China

See also
 Xandu (disambiguation)
 Xanadu (disambiguation)